This is a list of foreign players who played in Women's Professional Soccer, a women's soccer league in the United States that ran from 2009–11.  The following players
 have been on the roster for the WPS club(s) listed, not counting preseason.
 have not been capped by the U.S. national team on any level/have been capped by a team other than the U.S. national team.
 were born outside the U.S./have citizenship outside the U.S.

Australia
Collette McCallum - Sky Blue FC (2009)
Lisa De Vanna – Washington Freedom (2009–10) – magicJack (2011)
Heather Garriock – Chicago Red Stars (2009)
Sarah Walsh – Saint Louis Athletica (2009)

Brazil
Adriane – FC Gold Pride (2009)
Cristiane – Chicago Red Stars (2009–10)
Daniela – Saint Louis Athletica (2009)
Elaine – Saint Louis Athletica (2010)
Érika – FC Gold Pride (2009)
Fabiana – Boston Breakers (2009–10)
Formiga – FC Gold Pride (2009) – Chicago Red Stars (2010)
Francielle – Saint Louis Athletica (2009) – Sky Blue FC (2009)
Marta – Los Angeles Sol (2009) – FC Gold Pride (2010) – Western New York Flash (2011)
Maurine – Western New York Flash (2011)
Rosana – Sky Blue FC (2009–10)
Sissi – FC Gold Pride (2009)

Canada
Candace Chapman – Boston Breakers (2009) – FC Gold Pride (2010) – Western New York Flash (2011)
Martina Franko – Los Angeles Sol (2009)
Christine Latham – Boston Breakers (2009)
Karina LeBlanc – Los Angeles Sol (2009) – Philadelphia Independence (2010) – Chicago Red Stars (2010) – magicJack (2011)
Erin McLeod – Washington Freedom (2009–10)
Sharolta Nonen – Los Angeles Sol (2009) – Atlanta Beat (2010)
Kelly Parker – Sky Blue FC (2009, 2010) – Western New York Flash (2011) – Atlanta Beat (2011)
Sophie Schmidt – magicJack (2011)
Lauren Sesselmann – Sky Blue FC (2009) – Atlanta Beat (2010–11)
Christine Sinclair – FC Gold Pride (2009–10) – Western New York Flash (2011)
Melissa Tancredi – Saint Louis Athletica (2009)

China
Han Duan – Los Angeles Sol (2009)

Denmark
Johanna Rasmussen - Atlanta Beat (2010) - magicJack (2011)

England
Eniola Aluko – Saint Louis Athletica (2009–10) – Atlanta Beat (2010) – Sky Blue FC (2011)
Anita Asante – Sky Blue FC (2009, 2011) – Saint Louis Athletica (2010) – Chicago Red Stars (2010) – Washington Freedom (2010)
Karen Carney – Chicago Red Stars (2009–10)
Katie Chapman - Chicago Red Stars (2010)
Gemma Davison – Western New York Flash (2011)
Lianne Sanderson – Philadelphia Independence (2010–11)
Alex Scott – Boston Breakers (2009–11)
Kelly Smith – Boston Breakers (2009–11)
Karen Bardsley - Sky Blue FC (2009–11)

Finland
Laura Kalmari – Sky Blue FC (2010–11)

France
Camille Abily – Los Angeles Sol (2009–10) – FC Gold Pride (2010) 
Sonia Bompastor – Washington Freedom (2009–10)

Germany
Shelley Thompson - Atlanta Beat (2010)

Iceland

Hólmfríður Magnúsdóttir – Philadelphia Independence (2010–11)

Italy
Patrizia Panico - Sky Blue FC (2010)

Jamaica
Omolyn Davis – magicJack (2011)

Japan
Eriko Arakawa – FC Gold Pride (2009)
Aya Miyama – Los Angeles Sol (2009) – Saint Louis Athletica (2010) – Atlanta Beat (2010)
Homare Sawa - Washington Freedom (2009–10)
Mami Yamaguchi - Atlanta Beat (2010)

Mexico
Mónica Ocampo - Atlanta Beat (2010)
Verónica Pérez – Saint Louis Athletica (2010)

Netherlands
Daphne Koster - Sky Blue FC (2010)
Petra Hogewoning – Sky Blue FC (2011)

New Zealand
Ali Riley – FC Gold Pride (2010) – Western New York Flash (2011)

Norway
Lene Mykjåland – Washington Freedom (2010)
Solveig Gulbrandsen - FC Gold Pride (2010)

Portugal
Kimberly Brandão – Western New York Flash (2011)

Spain
Verónica Boquete – Chicago Red Stars (2010) – Philadelphia Independence (2011)
Laura del Río – Boston Breakers (2010) – Philadelphia Independence (2011)
Adriana Martín – Sky Blue FC (2011)

Sweden
Madelaine Edlund – Saint Louis Athletica (2010)
Johanna Frisk – Los Angeles Sol (2009)
Caroline Jönsson – Chicago Red Stars (2009)
Sara Larsson – Saint Louis Athletica (2009) – Philadelphia Independence (2010)
Frida Östberg – Chicago Red Stars (2009)
Kosovare Asllani - Chicago Red Stars (2010)
Jessica Landstrom - Sky Blue FC (2010)
Caroline Seger – Philadelphia Independence (2010) - Western New York Flash (2011)
Therese Sjögran – Sky Blue FC (2011)

Switzerland
Ramona Bachmann - Atlanta Beat (2010)

See also

United States
 
WPS, foreign
Association football player non-biographical articles